Donald Tilleman (February 23, 1919 – November 27, 1972) was mayor of Green Bay, Wisconsin.

Biography
Tilleman was born on February 23, 1919. He married Jane Steele of Reno, Nevada in 1940. They had seven children. Tilleman died on November 27, 1972 from a heart attack in New York City while on city business. He is buried in Allouez, Wisconsin.

Political career
Tilleman unsuccessfully ran for alderman before being elected in 1951. In 1963, he lost to Roman Denissen for mayor. Two years later, he defeated Denissen and served as mayor until his death. The Mason Street Bridge across the Fox River is named the Donald Tilleman Bridge in his honor, including a relief plaque with his face on the bridge keeper's house.

References

Wisconsin city council members
Mayors of Green Bay, Wisconsin
1919 births
1972 deaths
20th-century American politicians